Cormac Foley (born 24 October 1999) is an Irish rugby union player, currently playing for United Rugby Championship and European Rugby Champions Cup side Leinster. His preferred position is scrum-half.

Leinster
Foley was named in the Leinster academy for the 2020–21 season. He made his Leinster debut in Round 11 of the Pro14 Rainbow Cup against .
Foley signed his first senior contract in 2022 joining from the Leinster academy.

References

External links
itsrugby.co.uk Profile

1999 births
Living people
Irish rugby union players
Leinster Rugby players
Rugby union scrum-halves